Industrial Schools were established in Ireland under the Industrial Schools Act 1868 to care for "neglected, orphaned and abandoned children". By 1884, there were 5,049 children in such institutions throughout the country. The Act was superseded by the Children Act 1908.

Today in the Republic of Ireland, children may still be detained in protective custody. The nomenclature has changed from "industrial schools" and "reformatory schools" to "Children Detention Schools". There are five such institutions in the State. The equivalent institution in Northern Ireland is the Juvenile Justice Centre at Rathgael, near Bangor. It is now Northern Ireland's only children's detention centre following the closure of St Patrick's in Belfast and Lisnevin in Millisle (formerly known as Training Schools).

History 
The first Industrial School in Ireland was set up by Lady Louisa Conolly in Celbridge, Co. Kildare, where young boys learnt woodwork and shoe making skills as well as other trade skills.

Establishment of Reformatories and Industrial Schools
Reformatory Schools had been established in 1858 under a Poor Law amendment. Ten years later Industrial Schools were introduced by the Industrial Schools (Ireland) Act of 1868, four years after the equivalent in England. An 'upgraded' Reformatory Act was also introduced that year. Ironically, children charged with begging could not benefit under the terms of the original 1858 Act and were still being sent to adult prisons, but young burglars were being sent to the more benign 'special school'.

The next few decades found there was a building boom to provide new premises for both types of institution. Reformatories were intended for children found guilty of criminal offences, while Industrial Schools were for orphaned neglected and abandoned children and those considered in danger of contact with criminality. This latter category had previously been accommodated in so called "Ragged Schools" (such as the one at the Coombe in Dublin), and in the countrywide network of Workhouses.
Many private philanthropic schools were granted certificates as Reformatories or Industrial Schools for the reception of children committed by the courts. After certification, they became eligible for grants from public money in proportion to the number of children catered for.

Although Reformatory Schools were established first, Industrial Schools soon surpassed them, both in numbers of schools and of pupils. Between 1851 and 1858, ten Reformatories (five each for boys and girls) were certified. The 1868 Act insured that Protestant and Catholic children would be catered for separately, preventing proselytising.

Industrial Schools reached a maximum of 71 in 1898. Of the 61 in what is now the Republic of Ireland, 56 schools were Catholic-run and 5 were Protestant-run. Of the ten in what is now Northern Ireland, six were Catholic-run and four Protestant-run. Of the nine Protestant Industrial Schools in Ireland, five were for girls and four for boys.

By 1900, only seven of the ten original Reformatories remained. In 1917 the last Industrial School run by the Church of Ireland (Anglican) was closed in Stillorgan. A number of the reformatories were re-certified as Industrial Schools so that by 1922, only five remained (one of which was a Reformatory for boys in Northern Ireland).

Statistics 

The reformatory school population, which was nearly 800 immediately after the passing of the 1858 Act, fell to 300 in 1882, and to 150 in 1900. However, by 1875, there were 50 industrial schools, and the highest number of industrial schools was reached in 1898, when there were a total of 71 schools, of which 61 (56 schools for Catholics and five for Protestants) were in the 26 counties.

According to the Ryan report, the Department of Education and Skills has calculated the number of children discharged from Industrial Schools and Reformatories from 1930 to the 1970s as approximately 42,000. As the format of the statistical report changed during the 1970s, the population of the schools, which was well in decline by then, is given as an estimate only.

The Commission to Inquire into Child Abuse in Ireland

Child abuse investigation (Ireland)
The Commission to Inquire into Child Abuse was established in 2000 with functions including the investigation of abuse of children in institutions in the State. It was dependent on people giving evidence which they did in large numbers.

The conclusion of the report, issued in May 2009, was that over a period going back at least to the 1940s, many children in Industrial Schools in the Republic had been subjected to systematic and sustained physical, sexual, and emotional abuse. It also found that the perpetrators of this violence had been protected by their religious superiors, primarily out of self-interest to maintain the reputations of the institutions concerned. 42 of the 43 conclusions refer to the Industrial Schools.

Vaccine trials
Vaccine trials in some Industrial Schools were to be investigated by the Commission, but were discontinued by the Commission in 2003 following Court judgement. In a statement on their website the Commission said "The Vaccine Trials Inquiry was a Division of the Investigation Committee. Judicial Review proceedings seeking, inter alia, a declaration that the Order which established the Vaccine Trials Inquiry was ultra vires the Act of 2000, were initiated in November 2003. On 25 November 2003, an undertaking was given to the High Court, by the Commission, that it would not conduct any hearings in relation to the matters within the ambit of the Order, until the matter was settled.

The practical effect of this undertaking was that the work of the Division was suspended at that point and never re-commenced, given the subsequent decision of the Court, that the Order was ultra vires the Act."

Lord Justice Cherry's remarks 

Richard Robert Cherry, a future Chief Justice of Ireland, speaking in 1911 was of the opinion that:
It is impossible to exaggerate the good effect (of).... this twin system of Reformatory and Industrial Schools. The latter have been particularly successful in Ireland; and the combination of voluntary effort and private management, with State regulation and partial support—a rather dangerous experiment—has been completely justified by the result.

The Commission to Inquire into Child Abuse, concluded almost one hundred years later, documents widespread serious neglect as well as physical, emotional, and sexual abuse of children in many of the schools. The Commission only investigated complaints dating back to the 1940s (that is, with direct evidence from living persons), but its findings are at odds with Lord Justice Cherry's earlier assessment of the success of the 'experiment'.

List of industrial schools in Ireland (Republic of Ireland)

The Fisheries School in Baltimore, West Cork was run by a local board of management and directed by the local parish priest. The school was closed in the 1950s and its records allegedly deliberately destroyed.

The following schools were run by religious orders and funded by the public:

 Artane Industrial school, Dublin
 Carriglea Park Industrial School, Dún Laoghaire, County Dublin.
 Meath Protestant Industrial School for Boys, originally Elm cliff then Avondale House, Blackrock, Dublin
 Our Lady of Succour, Newtownforbes
 Summerhill Industrial School, Dublin, Protestant run school.
 Stilorgan Industrial School, Protestant run school (closed 1917).
 St Aidan's Industrial School for Girls, New Ross County Wexford, run by the Good Shepherd Order of nuns.
 St. Ann's Industrial School for Girls, Killarney, County Kerry
 St. Anne's Industrial School for Girls, Booterstown, County Dublin
 St. Anne's Reformatory School for Girls, Kilmacud, County Dublin
 St. Ann's Industrial School for Girls and Junior Boys, Renmore, Lenaboy, County Galway
 St. Augustine's Industrial School for Girls, Templemore, County Tipperary
 St. Bernard's Industrial School for Girls, Fethard, Dundrum, County Tipperary
 St. Bridgid's Industrial School for Girls, Loughrea, County Galway
 St. Coleman's Industrial School for Girls, Cobh/Rushbrooke, County Cork
 St. Columba's Industrial School for Girls, Westport, County Mayo
 St Columba's Industrial School for Boys, Killybegs, County Donegal
 St. Conleth's Reformatory School for Boys, Daingean, County Offaly
 St. Dominick's Industrial School for Girls, Waterford
 St. Finbarr's Industrial School for Girls, Sundays Well, Marymount, Cork
 St. Francis Xavier's Industrial School for Girls and Junior Boys, Ballaghadereen, County Roscommon
 St. Francis' Industrial School for Girls, Cashel, County Tipperary
 St. George's Industrial School for Girls, Limerick
 St. John's Industrial School for Girls, Birr, County Offaly
 St. Joseph's Industrial School, Letterfrack
 St. Joseph's Industrial School, Whitehall, Dublin
 St. Joseph's Industrial School, Kilkenny, Ireland
 St. Joseph's Industrial School for Boys, Passage West, County Cork
 St. Joseph's Industrial School for Boys, Tralee, County Kerry
 St. Joseph's Industrial School for Girls and Junior Boys, Ballinasloe, County Galway
 St. Joseph's Industrial School for Girls and Junior Boys, Clifden, County Galway
 St. Joseph's Industrial School for Girls and Junior Boys, Liosomoine, Killarney, County Kerry
 St. Joseph's Industrial School for Girls, Cavan
 St. Joseph's Industrial School for Girls, Dundalk, County Louth
 St. Joseph's Industrial School for Girls, Kilkenny
 St. Joseph's Industrial School for Girls, Mallow, County Cork
 St. Joseph's Industrial School for Girls, Summerhill, Athlone, County Westmeath
 St. Joseph's Industrial School for Girls, Whitehall, Drumcondra, Dublin 9
 St. Joseph's Industrial School for Senior Boys, Ferryhouse, Clonmel, County Tipperary
 St. Joseph's Industrial School for Senior Boys, Glin, County Limerick
 St. Joseph's Industrial School for Senior Boys, Greenmount, Cork
 St. Joseph's Industrial School for Senior Boys, Salthill, County Galway
 St. Joseph's Reformatory School for Girls, Limerick
 St. Kyran's Industrial School for Junior Boys, Rathdrum, County Wicklow
 St. Laurence's Industrial School for Girls, Sligo
 St. Laurence's Industrial School, Finglas, Dublin 11
 St. Martha's Industrial School for Girls, Bundoran, County Donegal
 St. Mary's Industrial School, Lakelands, Sandymount, Dublin 4
 St. Michael's Industrial School for Girls, Wexford
 St. Michael's Industrial School for Junior boys, Cappoquin, County Waterford
 St. Patrick's Industrial School, Kilkenny
 St. Patrick's Industrial School, Upton, County Cork
 St. Vincent's (House of Charity) Industrial School for Junior Boys, Drogheda, County Louth
 St. Vincent's Industrial School for Girls, Limerick
 St. Vincent's Industrial School, Goldenbridge, Inchicore, Dublin 8

List of industrial schools in Ireland (Northern Ireland)
Some abuse victims in industrial schools in Northern Ireland are taking a legal case against religious orders. There have also been calls for an inquiry. The Industrial Schools in Northern Ireland were gradually closed and emptied in the 1920s and 1930s, and were effectively gone by 1950.

 Balmoral Industrial School for Protestant Boys, Belfast, Co. Antrim. (Males)
 Hampton House Industrial School for Protestant Girls, Belfast. (Females)
 Lisnevin Training School, Millisle, Co. Down.
 The Malone Reformatory (Training School) Belfast, Co. Antrim. (Males)
 Shamrock Lodge Industrial School, Belfast, Co. Antrim. (Females)
 St. Patrick's Training School, Belfast, Co. Antrim

See also

 Magdalen Asylum
 Haut de la Garenne Saint Martin, Jersey.
 List of industrial schools

References

Bibliography
Murray, Patrick Joseph Reformatory Schools For Ireland (1856) A contemporary argument for sectarian segregation of juvenile offenders from Internet Archive.
 Report of the Commission to Inquire into Child Abuse, 2009..
. Vaccine Trials

External links
 Republic of Ireland
 Reformatory and Industrial School legislation and reports for Ireland _ 1861 to 1919.
St Michael's Industrial School, Wexford, 1901 & 1911 census
Report of the Commission to Inquire into Child Abuse, 2009

 Click VIEW/OPEN to download.
Northern Ireland
 
 NORTHERN IRELAND CHILD CARE LAW "THE ROUGH GUIDE" Fourth Report of the Children Order Advisory Committee – January 2004

1868 in Ireland
1868 in British law
Defunct schools in Northern Ireland
Defunct schools in the Republic of Ireland
History of education in Ireland
History of education in the United Kingdom
Legal history of Ireland
Schools in Ireland